Uppsala Monitoring Centre (UMC), located in Uppsala, Sweden, is the field name for the World Health Organization Collaborating Centre for International Drug Monitoring. UMC works by collecting, assessing and communicating information from member countries' national pharmacovigilance centres in regard to the benefits, harm, effectiveness and risks of drugs.

Background 
Since 1978, responsibility for managing the WHO Programme for International Drug Monitoring has been carried by UMC. In the early years the staff consisted of just three pharmacists based at the Swedish Medical Products Agency (Läkemedelsverket); currently over 100 staff work in central Uppsala. The founding chairman and acting Director was Professor Åke Liljestrand. From 1990 to 2009 the Director was Professor Ralph Edwards. Since September 2009 Dr. Marie Lindquist is the Director.  The Chief Medical Officer is Dr. Pia Caduff and the Head of Research is Dr. Niklas Norén.

The work of the UMC is:
 To co-ordinate the WHO Programme for International Drug Monitoring and its more than 100 member countries.
 To collect, assess and communicate information from member countries about the benefits, harms and risks of drugs and other substances used in medicine to improve patient therapy and public health worldwide
 To collaborate with member countries in the development and practice of the science of pharmacovigilance.

The main focus and source of data in pharmacovigilance are reports of ICSRs (individual case safety reports) from healthcare providers and patients in member countries of the WHO Programme. A WHO global individual case safety report database (VigiBase) is maintained and developed on behalf of the WHO by UMC. UMC develops and provides several tools and classifications for use by organisations involved in drug safety, including the WHO Drug Dictionary, WHOART (adverse reaction terminology) – with a bridge to the MedDRA terminology, tools for searching in the database, and a program for case report management, VigiFlow.

UMC's research covers mainly three areas: data-driven discovery (especially statistical techniques), dis-proportionality analyses, interaction detection, patterns and duplicate case detection), safety surveillance and signaling (among which drug dependence and pediatric use) and benefit—risk analysis.

The centre has been active in presenting research in the medical literature which has included some seminal works in the field. The Uppsala centre has also published books in the field of drugs safety including a regular newsletter. In 2010 the 2nd edition of a crisis management guide was published, entitled 'Expecting the Worst'.

UMC's role in drug safety has not been without controversy for both medicines agencies and pharmaceutical companies, despite an open approach willing to engage with many parties in the pharmaceutical world. They are closely involved in outreach to developing countries and other areas where pharmacovigilance is not yet handled.

WHO Programme key dates 
 1968 WHO Programme established.  International ADR terminology and drug dictionary
 1969 Definition of ADR
 1978 Operations transferred to the UMC; setting-up of relational ADR database.  Regular WHO Programme member meetings
 1981 Computerised version of WHO Drug Dictionary available to all
 1982 ATC classification coding of all medicinal products
 1985 International expert review panel created
 1991 On-line WHO database search programme available to national centres
 1991 Definitions of adverse event, side effect and causality assessment terms
 1993 Windows-based client server program for online database searches
 1993 Regular training and educational activities
 1994 Methodology for use of denominator data for calculation of ADR reporting rates
 1997 Knowledge-detection tool for automated signal detection (BCPNN)
 1997 Promotion of communication as a necessary discipline in pharmacovigilance : the 'Erice Declaration'
 1998 Internet discussion group for national centres
 2001 Start of VigiBase Online project (now VigiFlow)
 2002 New database system (VigiBase)
 2004 Pattern recognition using the BCPNN on health databases to find safety information.
 2005 Launch of expanded WHO Drug Dictionary with additional data fields; agreement with IMS Health to increase information in the dictionary
 2010 100th country joins the WHO Programme for International Drug Monitoring
 2012 Over 7 million adverse reaction reports in VigiBase, the WHO ICSR database
 2015 Over 12 million adverse drug reaction reports in VigiBase, the WHO ICSR database

See also
 International Conference on Harmonisation of Technical Requirements for Registration of Pharmaceuticals for Human Use (ICH)
 Council for International Organizations of Medical Sciences (CIOMS)
 International Society of Pharmacovigilance
 Society of Pharmacovigilance, India
 EudraVigilance (EEA)
 Yellow Card Scheme (UK)
 Clinical trial
 Drug development
 MedDRA
 WHOART

References

External links 
 Uppsala Monitoring Centre home
 Uppsala Reports is UMC's quarterly magazine for everyone concerned with the issues of pharmacovigilance

World Health Organization
Pharmacological societies
Pharmaceuticals policy
International medical and health organizations
Organizations established in 1978
World Health Organization collaborating centres
1978 establishments in Sweden